Kuala Lipis is a mukim and capital of Lipis District, Pahang, Malaysia with a population of 20,000.

History
Kuala Lipis was a gold-mining centre before the British arrived in 1887.  In 1898, it became the capital of Pahang within the British-administered Federated Malay States.  During this colonial era, grand buildings, such as the imposing district offices and the Clifford School, and the Pahang Club were built. The hilltop house of the British resident is now a hotel and museum.  The town grew and prospered with the coming of the railway in 1924. However, in August 1955, the state capital was shifted to Kuantan, and Kuala Lipis fell into decline.

Travel

Interesting Sites
Kuala Lipis old town.
Hilltop house of the British Resident.
Lipis District old Office.
Old railway station
Clifford School.
Rumah Banjir.
Pahang club.
Lipis Zoo.
Sungai Jelai.
Kuala Lipis new town. 
Lipis District new Office.
Muzium Warisan Lipis (Lipis Heritage Museum).
Hilltop house of Bukit Bius.
Hutan Lipur Terenggun.
Rumah Rakit.

Nature
Kuala Lipis has its own nature park, Kenong Rimba Park. It is a forest reserve, which is about 10 km away. Getting to the park requires a bus or cab to Tanjung Kiara Jetty - once there, activities in the reserve are involved, such as trekking, caving or off-roading.

Access

Public transport
A train station operated by Keretapi Tanah Melayu (KTM) is located near Jalan Pekeliling which is the main road of Kuala Lipis.
Pahang Lin Siong express buses connect Kuala Lipis to  Titiwangsa LRT/Monorail station in downtown Kuala Lumpur.

Car
Kuala Lipis is accessible by Federal Route 8, the main route from Kuala Lumpur to Kota Bharu. It is also connected to Jerantut, the main gateway to Taman Negara, via Federal Route 234.
Kuala Lipis is also a major gateway to the hill station of Cameron Highlands via Sungai Koyan using routes 235 and then 102.

Personalities

 Former Prime Minister of Malaysia, Najib Tun Razak was born in Kuala Lipis. On 28 December 2014 Najib Tun Razak visited the flood evacuation centre at the Sekolah Kebangsaan Clifford amidst flood-affected areas.
TUN Ghazali Shafie was born in Kuala Lipis.
Malaysian pop diva Siti Nurhaliza was also born here. Her family still lives in Kuala Lipis and the house she built for them became the talk of town as it was rumoured to cost millions of ringgit. It has now become a tourist attraction. The town council even provided directions to the house on a signboard and made parking space for tour buses available near the house. During her wedding in 2007, her wedding reception for friends and fans here was made an official function for the whole town by the council.

References

External links
Pyrokumprinx Advanced Media The only known personal site about living in Kuala Lipis. Features recent happenings and news.
KTM / MRT Line Integrations

Lipis District
Mukims of Pahang
Populated places in Pahang
Towns in Pahang